Irene Kwambai Kipchumba (born 25 October 1978) is a Kenyan long-distance runner.

Her first major medal came at the 2004 African Championships in Athletics where she took silver in the 10,000 metres behind Eyerusalem Kuma. She also won the Cursa de Bombers that year and repeated as the winner in 2005, setting a course record in the process. She ran at the 2005 World Championships in Athletics and was tenth in the women's 10,000 m. Her 2006 season was highlighted by a win at the Vitry-sur-Seine Half Marathon. She won the women's 5K race at the Prague Grand Prix the following year.

Kwambai was selected to represent Kenya in the 10,000 m at the 2007 All-Africa Games and she won the bronze medal. She was the silver medallist in the event at the 2007 World Military Games a few months later, where she was beaten by her national rival Doris Changeywo.

She ran at the Paul Tergat's Baringo Half Marathon in November 2010 and was fourth in the race.

Achievements

Road running
2006 Vitry-sur-Seine Half Marathon - 1st 
2007 Vitry-sur-Seine Half Marathon - 2nd 
2009 Prague Half Marathon - 2nd (time 1:09:27, PB)

Personal bests
Mile run - 4:38.02 min (2003)
3000 metres - 8:46.38 min (2003)
5000 metres - 14:49.32 min (2006)
10,000 metres - 30:55.67 min (2005)
Half marathon - 1:09:27 hrs (2010)

References

External links

1978 births
Living people
Kenyan female long-distance runners
African Games bronze medalists for Kenya
African Games medalists in athletics (track and field)
Kenyan female cross country runners
Athletes (track and field) at the 2007 All-Africa Games